This is a list of Vietnamese inventions and discoveries which includes technological, cultural and historical inventions. This list is incomplete.

Astronomy

Food processing

Nem chua is a fermented pork dish from Vietnamese cuisine. It is mainly composed of a mixture of lean pork and thin strips of cooked rind, garnished with garlic and chilli.

Game
Flappy Bird by Dong Nguyen in 2014.
Tam cúc is a multi-trick card game popular in North Vietnam.
Tò he is a traditional toy for children in Vietnam which is made from glutinous rice powder in form of edible figurine such as animals, flowers or characters in folk stories.
Tổ tôm
 7554: Glorious Memories Revived is a first-person shooter video game developed by Vietnamese video game developer Emobi Games for Windows. It was released for Vietnamese markets on December 16, 2011.
 Shadow Era is a free online digital collectible card game created by Vietnamese developer Wulven Studios. Cross platform gameplay is central to the digital version's design and it is supported on PC, Mac, iOS, and Android. It was released on February 24, 2011.
Garena Free Fire battle royale made by 111 Dots Studio and published by Garena.

Medicine
Music and instruments
Folk music
Ca Huế
Ca trù is an ancient Vietnamese music genre.
Chầu văn
Nhạc tài tử
Quan họ
Vọng cổ
Xẩm

Musical instrumentsBro, is a traditional musical instrument of the Bahnar, Sedang, Rhađe, Jarai, and Giẻ Xtiêng peoples of the Central Vietnam Highlands. It is a tube zither.CảnhDong Son drumĐàn bầu, is a Vietnamese stringed instrument, in the form of a monochord (one-string) zither.
Đàn đá
Đàn đáy
Đàn môi
Đàn gáo
Đàn nhị
Đàn sến
Guitar phím lõm
K'lông pút
K'ni
Ngoc Lu drum
Phách
Sáo
Sênh tiền
Song loan
T'rung
Trống cái
Trống chầu
Trống cơm

TechnologypdfTeX by Hàn Thế Thành.
 NanoDragon satellite VNI''' by Hồ Thành Việt

Theatre
Cải lương
Chèo
Chú Tễu is a type of puppet used in water puppetry.
Hát tuồng
Water puppetry

Painting
Đông Hồ painting is a genre of Vietnamese art.
Sơn Mài or lacquer painting. 
Hàng Trống painting is a genre of Vietnamese art
Vietnamese calligraphy is the style of calligraphy using the Vietnamese alphabet.

Other 
Phong reflection model
Phong shading
Proof of Fundamental lemma for automorphic forms by Ngô Bảo Châu
Vovinam is a Vietnamese martial arts.
Chữ Nôm is the classical writing system of Vietnam.
Coracle

References

 
Inventions
Vietnam